Lincoln Tate  (born James Harmon Kennelly, December 1, 1934December 16, 2001) was an American actor  and former Marine. He appeared in more than twenty films from 1965 to 1988.

After several minor roles in American films and television series he moved to Italy where he had the lead role in several Spaghetti Westerns.  He returned to the United States for several roles with his final film appearance being in Grotesque (1988) where he also is credited as an associate producer.

Filmography

References

External links 

1934 births
2001 deaths
American male film actors
United States Marines
Male Spaghetti Western actors
20th-century American male actors